The Arlington Stakes is a Grade III American Thoroughbred horse race for horses aged four years old over a distance of one and one-sixteenth miles on the turf held annually in late May or early June at Churchill Downs in Louisville, Kentucky.  The event currently carries a purse of $200,000.

It currently offers a purse of $200,000 and served as a final local prep race for the Arlington Million.

The race was hosted by the now defunct Washington Park Race Track in 1943, 1944 and 1945, and by the Hawthorne Race Course in 1985.

The Arlington Handicap was run on dirt in 1929–1940, 1942–1953, 1963, 1965–1972, and in 1975. There was no race held in 1940, 1969, 1970, 1971, 1988, 1998, or 1999.

In 2022, the event was moved to Churchill Downs after the closure of Arlington Park in Arlington Heights, Illinois and run over the shorter distance of  miles.

Distances:
  mile – 1968
 1 mile – 1963, 1966–1967
  miles – 2022
  miles – 1929, 1952, 1965
  miles – 1930–1939, 1942–1951, 1984 to 2014
  miles – 1941, 1953–1962, 1964, 1973–1976, 2015–2021
  miles – 1972, 1977–1983

Records
Speed  record:
 2:00.62 – Sky Classic (1992) (at  miles on Arlington Park turf)
 In 1985, Pass the Line ran  miles on turf in 2:00 2/5 at Hawthorne Race Course.
 1:53.16- Bandua (2019) (at  mile distance)

Most wins:
 3 – Rahystrada (2010, 2012, 2013)

Most wins by an owner:
 4 – Calumet Farm (1936, 1947, 1949, 1950)

Most wins by a jockey:
 4 – Bill Shoemaker (1958, 1959, 1965, 1983)

Most wins by a trainer:
 4 – Robert J. Frankel (1991, 1994, 1996, 2000)

Winners

References

 The Arlington Handicap at Pedigree Query

Graded stakes races in the United States
1929 establishments in Illinois
Open middle distance horse races
Arlington Park
Turf races in the United States
Horse racing in Illinois
Recurring sporting events established in 1929